Clay Pit Ponds State Park Preserve is  state park located near the southwestern shore of Staten Island, New York. It is the only state park located on Staten Island.

History
The park was the site of extensive mining of white kaolin clay in the 19th century that provided the raw material for bricks and terra cotta. After the abandonment of the quarrying operations, rainwater, natural springs, and vegetation filled in the pits. The preserve also contains archaeological evidence of settlements of the Lenape, early European settlers, and the Free Blacks of Sandy Ground.

The park was created in 1977 after extensive lobbying by the Protectors of Pine Oak Woods, a local conservation organization.

Groundbreaking for a $1.3 million nature center was held on May 4, 2007. In October 2008, the center opened with exhibits on the history of the Charleston area and wildlife and plants found within the park. The  facility contains exhibit space, classrooms, and an outdoor pavilion.

Park description

The park is a  nature preserve, comprising wetlands, ponds, sand barrens, spring-fed streams, and woodlands. It includes pitch pine woods, and rare wildflowers such as cranberry, lizard-tail, possumhaw, and bog twayblade. The animal species found in the park include northern black racer snakes, box turtles, eastern fence lizards, Fowler's toads, green frogs, and spring peepers. More than 170 bird species have been sighted in the park. Deer are also regularly seen there.

The purpose of the preserve is to retain the site's unique ecology, as well as to provide educational and recreational opportunities, such a nature walks, pond ecology programs, and birdwatching.

The park has two designated areas, which are set aside for endangered species and are off-limits to the public.

See also
 List of New York state parks

References

External links
 New York State Parks: Clay Pit Ponds State Park Preserve

State parks of New York (state)
Parks in Staten Island
Nature centers in New York City
Protected areas established in 1977
1977 establishments in New York (state)